Shari Shattuck (born November 18, 1960) is an American actress and author.

Shattuck was born in Atlanta, Georgia. She has appeared in hundreds of commercials, TV, film, and stage productions. Some roles include "Dallas", "Life Goes On", "On Deadly Ground" as well as multiple Shakespearean roles. She appeared in both nighttime and daytime soaps, sitcoms, mini-series and starred in multiple films. As a model, she appeared on the cover of Playboy in April 1980, and numerous other magazines. In 1982, while working as a model in Atlanta, she was cast in the music video of the .38 Special song "Caught Up in You".

Personal life
Shattuck was married to actor Ronn Moss (with whom she has two daughters — Creason  and Calee) from January 1990 to July 2002.  She later married Joseph Paul Stachura, the owner and managing artistic director of the Knightsbridge Theatre, The National American Shakespeare Company, as well as the Director of Knightsbridge Theatre Films. The couple has produced two movies together, "Redemption" and "Scream at the Devil."

In addition to acting, Shattuck has written for the stage and directed multiple productions. Her play, In Progress, was produced at the Matrix Theatre.

Shattuck is also a fiction writer who has written four mystery novels featuring Callaway Wilde, a wealthy Los Angeles socialite, the first of which, Loaded, was picked as one of the best of 2003 by Publishers Weekly. Other titles in the Callaway Wilde series are Lethal, Liar, and Legacy. She also wrote a psychic series featuring Greer Sands, Eye of the Beholder and Speak of the Devil and two hardcover literary fiction novels, Invisible Ellen and the sequel, Becoming Ellen.

Filmography

References

External links

1960 births
Actresses from Atlanta
American soap opera actresses
American television actresses
Living people
Writers from Atlanta
21st-century American women